The Qatari national ice hockey team is the national men's ice hockey team of Qatar. They are controlled by the Qatar Winter Sports Committee and has been a member of the International Ice Hockey Federation (IIHF) since 18 May 2012. Qatar is currently not ranked in the IIHF World Ranking and have not entered in any World Championship tournaments or at any Olympic Games, but have only played once in the Challenge Cup of Asia Division I tournament in 2016, a regional tournament for lower-tier hockey nations in Asia.

History
The sport was mostly unknown in Qatar, until the establishment of the first edition of the Qatar Ice Hockey Championship, with the participation of four teams to include Qatari, Canadian and English Czech's and Finnish players organized by the Sports Affairs Department of the Qatar Olympic Committee. Qatar's national team participated at the 2017 Asian Winter Games in Sapporo, Japan. The country has two ice rinks (Gondolania Ice Arena and City Centre Mall) with a two division hockey league providing official competition. The six teams for 2009–10 were the RasGas, Sandvipers, Qatar Qanucks, European Fitness Club, Sundogs, and CNAQ Breakers.

On 18 May 2012, Qatar was added as an official members by the IIHF. Qatar played its first game against Oman, which they lost 2–1. In 2014, Qatar participated in the Gulf Ice Hockey Championship. They played five games, losing four and winning one, earning the bronze medal against Oman 7–2. In 2018, Qatar was scheduled to compete in the Challenge Cup of Asia Division I tournament in Kuala Lumpur, Malaysia, but cancelled.

Roster
Roster for the 2016 IIHF Challenge Cup of Asia – Division I.

Tournament record

GCC Gulf Championship

Challenge Cup of Asia

Asian Winter Games

All-time Record against other nations
As of 6 April 2018

References

External links
International Ice Hockey Federation
Qatar national ice hockey team logo
Qatar Ice Hockey League Website

National ice hockey teams in Asia
Ice hockey
Ice hockey in Qatar
National ice hockey teams in the Arab world